The 1946 Michigan State Normal Hurons football team represented Michigan State Normal College (later renamed Eastern Michigan University) during the 1946 college football season. In their 24th season under head coach Elton Rynearson, the Hurons compiled a 1–6 record and were outscored by their opponents, 80 to 65. James F. Walton was the team captain. The team played its home games at Briggs Field on the school's campus in Ypsilanti, Michigan.

Schedule

References

Michigan State Normal
Eastern Michigan Eagles football seasons
Michigan State Normal Hurons football